Albany is a census-designated place (CDP) and unincorporated community located in Bryan County, Oklahoma, United States, on State Highway 70E. The post office opened July 10, 1894. The community was named for Albany, New York. As of the 2010 census, the population was 143. The area code is 580.

Demographics

References

Unincorporated communities in Bryan County, Oklahoma
Unincorporated communities in Oklahoma